The fauna of Canada consist of approximately 200 mammal species, over 460 native bird species, 43 amphibian species, 43 reptile species, and 1,200 fish species.  The biology survey of Canada cites that there are approximately 55,000 species of insects, and 11,000 species of mites and spiders. 

The most threatened wildlife species of Canada are listed in the List of Wildlife Species at Risk in accordance with the Canadian Species at Risk Act. About 65% of Canada’s resident species are considered "Secure". Over 500 animal species are considered at risk in Canada. More than 30 wildlife species have become extinct in the wild since the arrival of European settlers. The regions with the most endangered or threatened species are those in which humans have had the greatest impact on the environment. Protected areas of Canada  and National Wildlife Areas have been established to preserve and restore Canadian flora and fauna.

Vertebrates

Mammals

Mammals are found in all the regions of Canada.  Members of six orders of placental mammals inhabit Canada. They are the bats, carnivores (including the pinnipeds), artiodactyls, cetaceans, insectivores, rodents, and lagomorphs.  Additionally, one species of marsupial, the opossum, can now be found in southern Canada.

Because of its large wild spaces, Canada is home to many large mammals, some of which have been extirpated in more densely populated areas, for example large predators such as the grey wolf and the brown bear.  Well known as "Canadian" are those mammals that are comfortable in Northern Canada, such as the polar fox, caribou herds, the moose, the wolverine, and muskoxen herds.  Other prominent Canadian mammals are the Canada lynx, and the North American beaver, which is a major symbol of Canada.

In addition to these native mammals, many Eurasian mammals were introduced (either intentionally or accidentally) by European colonists.  Among them are domestic mammals, such as the horse, pig, sheep, dog, cat, and cattle, and wild mammals, such as the brown rat and the house mouse.

Birds

Canada's avifauna comprises 462 species, members of seventeen orders of bird. The two most diverse orders are the passerines and the charadriiformes. The most commonly known birds include the Canada goose, snowy owl, and the common raven.  Another prominent Canadian bird is the whooping crane, whose only breeding grounds are protected in Wood Buffalo National Park.

Reptiles

Canada has forty-three species of reptile, including turtles, lizards, and snakes.  Of the major types of reptile, only crocodiles are not found in Canada.

Canada has twenty-five species of snake, representing three families.  Most Canadian snakes are members of the colubrid family, including several species of garter snake. Additionally, the western provinces of Alberta and British Columbia have species of pit viper, such as the western rattlesnake, and British Columbia has Canada's only species of boa, the rubber boa.

Canada is home to six species of lizard, all living along the southern border with the United States.

Canada also has twelve species of turtle, representing six families.  A common turtle in Canada is the painted turtle, which can be found in all ten of Canada's southern provinces, except Newfoundland and Labrador.

Nunavut, the Yukon, and Newfoundland & Labrador have no indigenous reptiles.

Amphibians

Canada has forty-three types of amphibian, including salamanders as well as frogs and toads.

Canada's salamanders are found in all ten provinces, but none live in the three northern territories. Notable salamanders of Canada include the common spotted salamander of eastern Canada, and the rare pacific giant salamander of British Columbia's coastal rainforest.

Frogs and toads are found in every region of Canada, though more are found in the south.  Canada is home to five families of frogs and toads, including the true frogs, true toads, and tree frogs, which are found in every province and territory (except Nunavut, which only has true frogs), the spadefoots, which are found in the prairie provinces, and the tailed frog, which is found only in British Columbia.

Fish

Canada's rivers are famous for their annual runs of Atlantic salmon on the east coast and Pacific salmon on the west coast. Canada's many freshwater lakes and streams are home to rainbow trout, Arctic char, and brook trout. In the past, invasive species such as the lamprey and zebra mussel have threatened these native species, and while efforts to combat them have been made they still remain a hazard in some areas, and there are ongoing effort to prevent the spread of Asian carp from the United States.
There are also significant commercial fisheries of many salt-water species, including Atlantic cod, haddock and halibut, although some of these are in decline.

Invertebrates

It is estimated that there are about 33,000 species of arthropods in Canada.

Due partially to the harshness of its winters, Canada has no native poisonous insects.
 List of butterflies of Canada
 List of moths of Canada
 List of damselflies of Canada
 List of dragonflies of Canada

See also

Wildlife of Canada
 Flora of Canada

References

Further reading
 
 
 Ross, Alexander Milton (1871), The Birds of Canada, Rowsell and Hutchison.

External links

Wildlife, plants and species ~ Government of Canada 
Species at Risk Public Registry A to Z Species Index